A roundabout is a type of road junction at which traffic enters a stream around a central island after first giving way to the circulating traffic.

Roundabout may also refer to:

Music
 Roundabout (album), a 2006 album by Phil Keaggy
 "Roundabout" (song), a song by the band Yes
 Roundabout, an early name for rock band Deep Purple

Film and television
 Roundabout (1950 film), English title of the French film La Ronde
 Roundabout (1957 film), an Australian television film
 Roundabout (1989 film), English title of the French film Un tour de manège
 Roundabout (TV program), a 1967–1971 Australian morning television program that aired on ATV-0 (now ATV-10)

Rides
 Carousel, a fairground ride also known as a roundabout
 Roundabout (play), a children's ride similar to a carousel
 Round About (roller coaster), a roller coaster at Freestyle Music Park in Myrtle Beach, South Carolina

Other
 Round About (sculpture), a sculpture by Linda Howard at the Lynden Sculpture Garden
 Roundabout, Newfoundland and Labrador, a defunct settlement in Canada
 Roundabout interchange, an interchange between a freeway and a minor road
 Roundabout Theatre Company, a non-profit theater company based in New York City
 Roundabout family, a family of transmembrane receptors
 Roundabout (video game), a 2014 independent computer game
 Roundabout, a type of bet offered by UK bookmakers
 Roundabout, an American term for a jacket also known as a wamus

See also
 
 Roundaboutness, a method of goods production